Woodrising is a suburb of the City of Lake Macquarie, Greater Newcastle in New South Wales, Australia, and is located northeast of the town of Toronto on the western shore Lake Macquarie.

History 
The Awabakal are the traditional people of this area.

References

External links
 History of Woodrising (Lake Macquarie City Library)

Suburbs of Lake Macquarie